Saparmyrat Türkmenbaşy District   is a district of Daşoguz Province in Turkmenistan. The administrative center of the district is the town of Saparmyrat Türkmenbaşy.

Founded as Oktyabrskiy District of Tashauz Region in February 1975, this district was included in Dashoguz and renamed as Saparmyrat Türkmenbaşy by none other than himself in 1992.

Districts of Turkmenistan
Daşoguz Region